WWVW-LD, virtual channel 56 (UHF digital channel 8), is a low-powered television station licensed to Wheeling, West Virginia, United States. The station is owned by Abacus Television, which owns a number of LPTV stations in the Pittsburgh, Pennsylvania area. WWVW is currently off the air.

History
WWVW-LP began operations on September 28, 1990, as W62BW. In 1999, it changed its callsign to W56DX. The station was an American Independent Network affiliate and also aired programming from shopping networks.

The station was silent for a time between 2002 and 2005 as the station upgraded its facilities. The station returned to the air in the summer of 2005 with  the call sign WWVW-LP and began airing Jewelry TV. On November 19, 2012, the station changed its call sign to the current WWVW-LD.

WWVW went silent in 2014 because of financial issues.

See also
Jewelry TV
WIIC-LD
WBYD-CD
WSSS-LP

References

External links 

WVW-LD
Television channels and stations established in 1990
1990 establishments in West Virginia
Low-power television stations in the United States